Reza Zarei is a former chief of Tehran Police in charge of the Guidance Patrol for Islamic values. 

In March 2008, Zarei was found with six naked women in a house of prostitution in Tehran. Zarei was himself in charge of the so-called "Public security plan" which was aimed at enforcing Islamic dress code and fight indecent behavior of youth in the Iranian capital.

Zarei was arrested and lost his post. However, in an interview broadcast by the Islamic Republic of Iran Broadcasting, the next commander of Tehran police denied all the accusations against Zarei. On April 23, 2008, Zarei was transferred to a hospital after an attempted suicide.

References

Iranian police campaigner for virtue is arrested

Living people
Year of birth missing (living people)
Place of birth missing (living people)
Iranian police officers
Islamic Revolutionary Guard Corps personnel of the Iran–Iraq War